Dracy is the name or partial name of several communes in France:

 Dracy, in the Yonne department
 Dracy-Saint-Loup, in the Saône-et-Loire department
 Dracy-le-Fort, in the Saône-et-Loire department
 Dracy-lès-Couches, in the Saône-et-Loire department